Ayarza is a surname of Basque origin, meaning "sloped valley".

People with the name
 Rosa Mercedes Ayarza de Morales (1881–1969), Peruvian composer
 Petita Ayarza (born 1965), Panamanian politician and businesswoman
 Josimar Ayarza (born 1987), Panamanian basketball player
 Abdiel Ayarza (born 1992), Panamanian footballer

See also
 Laguna de Ayarza, a crater lake in Guatemala

References

Basque-language surnames